Yengi Kand-e Jame ol Sara (also Romanized as Yengī Kand-e Jāme‘ ol Sarā and Yengī Kand-e Jāme‘ os Sarā; also known as Yangi Kand, Yengī Gand-e Jāmeh, Yengī Kand, Yengīkand-e Jāme‘eh Sarā, Yengī Kand-e Jāmeh Sarā, Yengī Kand-e Jameh Sarā, and Yengī Kand-e Jāme‘ Sarā) is a village in Ijrud-e Pain Rural District, Halab District, Ijrud County, Zanjan Province, Iran. At the 2006 census, its population was 523, in 119 families.

References 

Populated places in Ijrud County